This is a list of Australian films that have been released in 2021.

Feature films

Short films

See also
 2021 in Australia
 2021 in Australian television
 List of 2021 box office number-one films in Australia

2021
Australian
 Films